Origin:Orphan is the fifth studio album by The Hidden Cameras, released September 22, 2009. It is the band's first release on Arts & Crafts.

The album's first official single is "In the NA", although the song "Walk On" was previously released as a preview track on the web and the compilation album Arts & Crafts Sampler Vol. 6. The music video for "In the NA" was screened at several film festivals, including the 19th Annual Inside Out Film and Video Festival, the opening night of SXSW and the 2008 Atlantic Film Festival.

Track listing
 "Ratify the New" – 6:31
 "In the NA" – 4:20
 "He Falls to Me" – 4:09
 "Colour of a Man" – 4:48
 "Do I Belong?" – 4:12
 "Walk On" – 4:42
 "Kingdom Come" – 3:10
 "Origin:Orphan" – 5:21
 "Underage" – 2:50
 "The Little Bit" – 2:38
 "Silence Can Be a Headline" – 5:17

References 

2009 albums
The Hidden Cameras albums
Arts & Crafts Productions albums